Holy Cross School is a Christian minority co-educational school situated in Bokaro Steel City, Jharkhand, India. The school was established in April 1974 and it is affiliated to the Central Board of Secondary Education, New Delhi. The school's management is run by International Christian Women Religious Congregation known as ‘Sisters of Mercy of Holy Cross’.

About school 
The admission process is quite result oriented compared to the other schools in Bokaro, which makes it good opportunity for families who wish to provide their children with best of the education at a reasonable cost students. It can be considered by students who have a keen interest in science, commerce or arts as a specialization with normal grades considering the fact that most of the average reputed schools in Bokaro have increased the cut off which only considers student above 90% above. The Admission process consists mostly of a test conducted by the school which is of Average difficulty.

The campus infrastructure of the school is well maintained and consists of classrooms, library, science labs, auditorium, football ground, basketball court, workshop rooms and many more common requirements out of a school.

The school organizes various functions, such as the annual sports day, annual fete which is open anyone interested in visiting, and regular science/debate/mathematics completions.

The school has good reputation in the society but it is mostly criticized of being located out of the city areas which can be now overlooked considering the fact the growth of the city which is massively speeding up.

Demographics 
The school is located in the outskirts of the city in Balidih which is an industrial area comprising various manufacturing and textile industries.  The school has good reputation in the society but it is mostly criticized of being located out of the city areas which can be now overlooked considering the fact the growth of the city which is massively speeding up.

The school attracts students mostly from areas like Balidih, Jainamore, Tupakadih and various other areas that are located in the outskirts but it also has students from other parts of the cities which is less compared to the number of students from outskirts of the city.

See also
 Bokaro Public School
Education in India
List of schools in India
CBSE

References

External links 
 
 
 http://www.thelearningpoint.net/home/school-listings/cbse-6/HOLY-CROSS-SCHOOL-BOKARO-STEEL-CITY-BOKARO-DISTT-JHARKHAND-3430012
 https://timesofindia.indiatimes.com/city/chennai/Schools-set-unofficial-cut-off-mark-for-admission-to-Class-11/articleshow/45935848.cms
 http://www.infinitecourses.com/School-Details.aspx?School=Holy-Cross-School-Bokaro&SchoolID=1313

Christian schools in Jharkhand
Education in Bokaro Steel City
Educational institutions established in 1974
1974 establishments in Bihar